Johanna Siméant-Germanos (born December 1969 Nancy) is a French political scientist. In 2019, she received the CNRS silver medal.

Life 
She graduated from the Institut d'études politiques d'Aix-en-Provence (1990), and from the Institut d'études politiques de Paris (1995). She is an associate professor of political science.

She worked at the University of Versailles Saint-Quentin, La Rochelle University, Lille 2 University of Health and Law,  and the University of Paris I Panthéon Sorbonne (CESSP). She is a professor of political science in the department of social sciences at the École Normale Supérieure, and member of the Center Maurice Halbwachs.  She was visiting professor at New York University, and Columbia University.

She was responsible for the GDR CNRS "Extreme Crises" (2003-2009) and member of the Institut universitaire de France from 2007 to 2012.

Member of the editorial board of the journal Genèses, and of the Scientific Council of the Revue française de science politique, specializing in political sociology. Her main research themes relate to mobilizations, commitment, humanitarian action, African studies and the international political sociology.

In September 2020, she became head of the social sciences department at the École Normale Supérieure.

Works 

 La cause des sans-papiers (Presses de Sciences-Po, 1998), 
 with Pascal Dauvin, Le travail humanitaire. Les acteurs des ONG, entre siège et terrain, (Presses de Sciences-Po, 2002)
 
 La grève de la faim (Presses de Sciences-Po, 2009)

References 

French political scientists
1969 births
Living people